Jacinto Barquín Rivero (3 September 1915 – unknown) was a Cuban footballer.

International career

1938 World Cup
He represented Cuba at the 1938 FIFA World Cup in France. In three matches, Barquín won once, drew once and lost once.

1950 World Cup qualifiers
Barquín again represented Cuba internationally in 1949, losing twice to Mexico in qualifiers for the 1950 FIFA World Cup.

References

External links
 

1915 births
Year of death missing
Association football defenders
Cuban footballers
Cuba international footballers
1938 FIFA World Cup players